Vijay Prakash Singh, also known as Vijay Prakash, is an Indian gastroenterologist and the Head of Department of Gastroenterology at Patna Medical College, Bihar. He was honoured by the Government of India in 2003 with Padma Shri, the fourth highest Indian civilian award, and only the 7th doctor in Bihar state to receive the award.

Life
Prakash was born in Banka. He is reported to have contributed to the establishment of the department of gastroenterology at the medical college and at Indira Gandhi Institute of Medical Sciences (IGIMS). He is also involved with BIG Hospital Institute of Gastroenterology as the chief gastroenterologist and medical director. He is a member of the executive council of the Medical Council of India and a member of the Indian Society of Gastroenterology. He is the author of several medical research papers, published in peer reviewed journals.

He has given talks on hepatitis and non-alcoholic steato-hepatitis (NASH): a severe form of non alcoholic fatty liver disease (NAFLD).

Awards
"Padma Shree" by the Government of India
"Icons of Bihar" by Outlook in 2018

See also

 Gastroenterology

References

External links
 Big Apollo Spectra Hospitals Doctor biography
 Doctor profile
 Doctor Appointment profile 

Recipients of the Padma Shri in medicine
Indian medical researchers
Indian medical writers
Living people
Indian gastroenterologists
20th-century Indian medical doctors
Scientists from Patna
Medical doctors from Bihar
Year of birth missing (living people)